The International League is a high school athletic conference in Los Angeles County, California affiliated with the CIF Southern Section.

Schools
As of 2018, the schools in the league are:
Calvary Baptist School
Lycée Français de Los Angeles	
Armenian Mesrobian School
New Harvest Christian School
St. Monica Academy
The Waverly School
Yeshiva High Tech
International School of Los Angeles
New Covenant Academy

References

CIF Southern Section leagues